Carla is a feminine given name.

Carla may also refer to:

Weather
Tropical Storm Carla (1956)
Hurricane Carla, one of two Category 5 tropical cyclones during the 1961 Atlantic hurricane season
Typhoon Carla (1962), a Category 1 typhoon
Typhoon Carla (1967), a Category 5 typhoon
Typhoon Carla (1965), a Category 4 typhoon
Tropical Storm Carla (1971)
Typhoon Carla (1974), a Category 1 typhoon
Tropical Storm Carla (1977)

Other uses

1470 Carla, a main belt asteroid 
"Carla" (song), a song by Miguel Bosé
Carla (album), a 1987 album by Steve Swallow
Carla (film), a British television crime drama film
Carle (disambiguation)

See also
Karla (disambiguation)